The church of Santi Faustino e Giovita, known also as the church of  San Faustino Maggiore is a Roman Catholic church in Brescia, Italy. It is situated on Via San Faustino. The church was originally attached to a monastery founded in the 9th century, but it has been rebuilt across the centuries. It was initially consecrated in 1142. The saints Faustino and Giovita are the patron saints of Brescia.

The interior of the church has extensive frescoes, mostly completed in the Baroque era. They include works by Tommaso Sandrino in the nave, and by Giandomenico Tiepolo in the presbytery, where he painted the Apotheosis of Saints Faustino, Giovita, Benedetto e Scolastica.  Other notable works of art are the ark at the main altar (1623) by Antonio Carra, Nativity by Lattanzio Gambara, a Deposition by Sante Cattaneo, a Stendardo del Santissimo Sacramento painted by  Girolamo Romanino.

External links
Bresciacity website

Faustino
Faustino
Faustino